Zaninović is a surname. Notable people with the surname include:

Ana Zaninović (born 1987), Croatian taekwondo practitioner
Lucija Zaninović (born 1987), Croatian taekwondo practitioner
Marjan Zaninović (1911–1968), Croatian rower

Croatian surnames